Christianne Balk (born 1953) is an American poet.

Life
Balk graduated with honors in biology from Grinnell College and taught at the University of British Columbia. Her work has appeared in Pequod, Crazy Horse, Sulfur, The Centennial review The Missouri Review, Sonora Review, Prairie Schooner Harper's, and The New Yorker. She lives in Seattle, Washington, with her husband and daughter.

Awards
 1985 Walt Whitman Award
 1994 Verna Emory Award

Works

Poetry

Anthologies

See also
American poetry

References

1953 births
Living people
Grinnell College alumni
Academic staff of the University of British Columbia
American women poets
Writers from Seattle
20th-century American poets
20th-century American women writers
American expatriates in Canada
American women academics